Alphonse Van Bredenbeck de Châteaubriant (25 March 1877 – 2 May 1951) was a French writer who won the Prix Goncourt in 1911 for his novel Monsieur de Lourdines and Grand prix du roman de l'Académie française for La Brière in 1923.

After a visit to Germany in 1935 he became an enthusiastic advocate for Nazism.

Along with other Breton nationalists he supported fascist and anti-semitic ideas in opposition to the French state. In 1940 he founded the pro-Nazi weekly newspaper La Gerbe and served as President of the Groupe Collaboration. During World War II, he was a member of the central committee of the Légion des Volontaires Français contre le Bolchévisme, an organisation founded in 1941 by Fernand de Brinon and Jacques Doriot to recruit volunteers to fight alongside the Germans in the USSR. In 1945 he fled to Austria, where he lived under the alias Dr. Alfred Wolf until his death at a monastery in Kitzbühel.

Works
 1908: Le Baron de Puydreau (novella)
 1909: Monsieur de Buysse (novella)
 1911: Monsieur des Lourdines (novel - Prix Goncourt)
 1923: La Brière (novel - Grand prix du roman de l'Académie française)
 1927: La Meute
 1928: Locronan
 1933: La Réponse du Seigneur
 1937: La Gerbe des forces
 1937: Le bouquet fané
 1938: Les pas ont chanté
 1953: ...Des saisons et des jours... Journal de l'auteur, 1911-1924
 2004: Fragments d'une confession – La sainteté

References

External links
 

1877 births
1951 deaths
Writers from Rennes
French Roman Catholics
French fascists
Christian fascists
20th-century French writers
20th-century French male writers
French collaborators with Nazi Germany
Prix Goncourt winners
Grand Prix du roman de l'Académie française winners
Catholicism and far-right politics